The 1988–89 East Tennessee State Buccaneers basketball team represented East Tennessee State University during the 1988-89 NCAA Division I men's basketball season. The team was led by head coach Les Robinson. The Bucs finished the season 20–11 and 7–7 in Southern Conference play to finish in fourth place. They won the Southern Conference tournament championship in Asheville to receive the automatic berth to the NCAA tournament as the No. 16 seed in the Southeast region. They lost to No. 1 seed Oklahoma, 72–71 in the first round – the second game of the tournament between No. 1 and No. 16 seeds decided by a single point (Georgetown vs. Princeton). This was the first of four consecutive seasons where ETSU qualified for the NCAA Tournament.

Roster

Source

Source

Schedule and results

|-
!colspan=9 style=| Regular season

|-
!colspan=9 style=| SoCon tournament

|-
!colspan=9 style=| NCAA tournament

Source

References

East Tennessee State Buccaneers men's basketball seasons
East Tennessee State
East Tennessee State
East Tennessee
East Tennessee